Pseudocneorhinus bifasciatus, the twobanded Japanese weevil, is a species of broad-nosed weevil in the beetle family Curculionidae.

References

Further reading

External links

 

Entiminae